The  was a seasonal limited express sleeper train service operated by East Japan Railway Company (JR East), which ran from Ueno Station in Tokyo to , via the Joetsu Line, Uetsu Main Line and Ou Main Line. The journey took approximately 12 hours.

Service outline
During busy holiday seasons, one Akebono service operates in each direction daily between Ueno in Tokyo and Aomori, stopping at the following main stations. Prior to 15 March 2014, the train ran daily all year round. While JR East has not formally announced its discontinuation, no services have operated since January 2015.

Rolling stock
The train is formed of 24 series sleeping cars based at JR East's Aomori Depot, typically consisting of 13 cars including a KaNi24 generator car at the Aomori end.

Formation
Since the 15 March 2008 timetable revision, Akebono services are normally formed as shown below, with car 1 at the Ueno (Tokyo) end.

 Car 1 includes women-only couchettes and Goronto Seat couchettes without bedding.
 The KaNi 24 is a generator car.

Rolling stock timeline
The changes in rolling stock and locomotive haulage over the years are as shown below.

Coaches

Locomotive haulage

Interior

History

Sendai - Aomori express (1962 - 1968)
The train operated using a three-car KiHa 58 series DMU formation, consisting of KiHa 58 + KiRo 28 + KiHa 58. The down service departed from Sendai Station at 13:50, arriving at Akita at 18:35, and reaching Aomori at 21:56. The up working departed from Aomori at 06:25, departing from Akita at 09:50, arriving at Sendai at 14:30.

From April 1963, between Akita and Aomori, the train ran coupled with the two-car  express service, which ran between Kanazawa and Aomori along the Sea of Japan coast.

From the start of the 1 October 1968 timetable revision, the train was renamed .

Ueno - Aomori limited express (1970 - )
From 1 October 1970, the train became a daily scheduled train, and was extended to run between Ueno and Aomori. The down service departed from Ueno Station at 22:05, arriving at Akita at 07:20 the following morning, and reaching Aomori at 10:39. The up working departed from Aomori at 18:05, departing from Akita at 21:25, arriving at Ueno at 06:50 the following morning.

From the start of the revised timetable in October 1973, a second daily return Akebono working was added, running between Ueno and Akita. From 1 October 1980, the original 20 series sleeping cars were replaced by 24 series sleeping cars.

From the start of the revised timetable in November 1982, a third daily return Akebono working was added. However, with increasing competition from daytime train services and air services, services were cut back to two return workings daily between Ueno and Aomori from March 1988.

From September 1990, with re-gauging work starting on the Ou Main Line between Fukushima and Shinjo in preparation for the new Yamagata Shinkansen, one return Akebono working was renamed  and re-routed via the Joetsu Line and Uetsu Main Line. The remaining Akebono working was re-routed to run via the Rikuu East Line between Fukushima and Shinjo, requiring haulage by pairs of JNR Class DE10 diesel locomotives.

From the start of the revised timetable on 15 March 2014, regular Akebono services were discontinued, but services still operate during busy seasons.

See also
 Blue Train (Japan)

References

External links

 JR East Akebono train information 

East Japan Railway Company
Named passenger trains of Japan
Railway services introduced in 1970
Night trains of Japan
Railway services discontinued in 2015
2015 disestablishments in Japan